The Southern Athletic Conference is an IHSAA-sanctioned athletic located within Clark, Harrison, and Jackson Counties in South Central Indiana. The conference began in 1974 as a four school conference, and grew to eight members within five years as other local conferences disbanded. The conference has lost two schools in the years since; both left for the Mid-Southern Conference. The Southern also had schools that had dual membership in other conferences at the same time, though by 1986, all of these schools entered full membership with a sole conference.

Membership 

 Borden played in both the SAC and the LRC for the 1974–75 season before leaving the LRC in 1975. Crothersville played in both the SAC and the MHC from 1974 to 1983.

Former members

 Austin played concurrently in the SAC and MSC during its entire tenure in the Southern. Eastern had dual membership in the SAC and LRC from 1975 to 1977, when the LRC disbanded.

Resources 
 IHSAA Conferences
 IHSAA Directory

Indiana high school athletic conferences
High school sports conferences and leagues in the United States